Zina  (الزنا) is the term for unlawful sexual intercourse in Islam

Zina may refer to:

People
 Zina (given name)
 Peggy Zina (born 1975), Greek singer-songwriter

Music
 "Zina" (song), a 2012 song by Algerian band Babylone
 One of the characters described in OMC's song "How Bizarre"

Others
 The Yelang, a historical political entity and tribal alliance in what is now south-west China
 Zina (film), a 1985 film
 Zina, a streaming media system